Bachia talpa, Ruthven's bachia, is a species of lizard in the family Gymnophthalmidae. It is endemic to Colombia.

References

Bachia
Reptiles of Colombia
Endemic fauna of Colombia
Reptiles described in 1925
Taxa named by Alexander Grant Ruthven